() is a Japanese company in the wireless communication industry.

History
Uniden was established on February 7, 1966, by its founder Hidero Fujimoto as "Uni Electronics Corp". Uniden became a well-known brand in the 1970s by manufacturing and marketing millions of citizens band radios (CB), under the Uniden brand as well as many for popular private brand labels such as  Clegg (amateur transceivers), Cobra, Craig, Fanon-Courier, Midland (only certain clone models, originals were made by Cybernet), President, Teaberry, Stalker, Super Star, Teledyne-Olson, Pearce Simpson, Realistic, Regency, Robyn and many European brands such as Zodiac, Stabo and Inno-Hit.  Uniden also marketed CB Radios in the UK under the Uniden and Uniace brands during the early '80s.

During the 1980s, Uniden grew to become the world's largest manufacturer of cordless telephones in addition to television satellite equipment, mobile radios, advanced marine electronics and radio scanners (the latter under brandname Bearcat).

In Europe, it became successful in the telecommunications market with its introduction of 900 MHz cordless telephones.

As Uniden continued to grow and extend its international operations, Uniden Australia and Uniden New Zealand were established in 1989.

Uniden's revenue has plummeted since smartphones and VOIP solutions have become mainstream. In 2007, Uniden had a revenue of 77.7 billion yen.  Just three years later in 2010, Uniden reported a revenue of just 35.5 billion yen.

Operation
As of 2018, current products include cordless phones, radar detectors, radio scanners, CB radios, and security/surveillance products.

At one point Uniden produced over two million wireless products every month and manufactures one cordless phone every 3.2 seconds. This statistic has become part of their company description used by many retailers and the date of the statistic is unknown. Despite the cordless phone's falling popularity, this claim still appears on Uniden Australia's website. 

Uniden operates globally, but the main commercial activities are situated in the United States and Japan. Manufacturing sites have been located in China, Hong Kong, Taiwan, and the Philippines. In 2008, Uniden began to move production from China to Vietnam because of lower wages.

References

External links
 — Uniden Global
 — Uniden Cellular Boosters

Electronics companies of Japan
Telecommunications companies based in Tokyo
Amateur radio companies
Marine electronics
Manufacturing companies based in Tokyo
Telecommunications companies established in 1966
1966 establishments in Japan
Companies listed on the Tokyo Stock Exchange
Japanese brands
Radio manufacturers